Carlos Erick Zegarra Presser (born September 1, 1984 in Lima) is a Peruvian judoka, who played for the heavyweight category. He won a bronze medal for his division at the 2007 Pan American Games in Rio de Janeiro, Brazil. Zegarra stands 2.08 metres (6 ft 10 in) tall and weighs 165 kilograms (364 lb).

Zegarra represented Peru at the 2008 Summer Olympics in Beijing, where he competed for the men's heavyweight class (+100 kg). He defeated Argentina's Sandro López in the second preliminary round, before losing out his next match, by an ippon and a yoko shiho gatame, to Cuban judoka and Pan American Games champion Óscar Brayson. Because his opponent advanced further into the semi-finals, Zegarra offered another shot for the bronze medal by entering the repechage rounds. Unfortunately, he was defeated in the first repechage bout by Lebanon's Rudy Hachache, who successfully scored a waza-ari awasete ippon (two full points) and a soto makikomi (outer wraparound), at one minute and fifty-five seconds.

References

External links

NBC Olympics Profile

Peruvian male judoka
Living people
Olympic judoka of Peru
Judoka at the 2007 Pan American Games
Judoka at the 2008 Summer Olympics
Pan American Games bronze medalists for Peru
Sportspeople from Lima
1984 births
Pan American Games medalists in judo
South American Games silver medalists for Peru
South American Games bronze medalists for Peru
South American Games medalists in judo
Competitors at the 2006 South American Games
Medalists at the 2007 Pan American Games
21st-century Peruvian people